Auyuittuq National Park ("the land that never melts") is a national park located on Baffin Island's Cumberland Peninsula, in the Qikiqtaaluk Region of Nunavut, the largest political subdivision of Canada. The park was initially known as Baffin Island National Park when it was established in 1972, but the name was changed in 1976 to its current name to better reflect the region and its history. It features many terrains of Arctic wilderness, such as fjords, glaciers, and ice fields. Although Auyuittuq was established in 1972 as a national park reserve, it was upgraded to a full national park in 2000.

Location and access
Auyuittuq National Park is located on the Cumberland Peninsula of Baffin Island in Nunavut. The park is located within the Arctic Circle. The Penny Ice Cap, made of ice sitting on Precambrian granite, creates a series of glaciers, among them the Coronation Glacier. The land reflects the geological history of the area, with deep valleys between the peaks, which include Mount Asgard with an  face, and Mount Thor with a  face. Along the coast are deep, narrow fjords. In Akshayuk Pass, the winds can reach .

The nearest towns are Qikiqtarjuaq and Pangnirtung. Visitors wishing to enter the park are required by Parks Canada to register at the park office in Pangnirtung or Qikiqtarjuaq, and attend an orientation session. Park user fees apply.

History
First established in 1972 as Baffin Island National Park, in 1975, Parks Canada chose to rename the park in order to better reflect the landscape and the Inuit history within the region. After some debate, the name was changed to Auyuittuq National Park, which is an Inuktitut word meaning "the place that does not melt".

Flora and fauna
Little vegetation can be found in Auyuittuq Park, although the plants found there range from flowers such as mountain avens, campion, Papaver, and saxifrage to shrubs like dwarf birch, Arctic willow, and heather. Many of the plants in Auyuittuq Park grow in clumps to create their own warmer "microclimate" to survive the harsh Arctic conditions.

Because of the exceptionally low vegetation supply on land, wildlife is very scarce. However, the park is bordered on three sides by sea and marine life is found within the park's boundaries. Species that live in Auyuittuq Park include lemmings (both the North American brown lemming and the northern collared lemming), red foxes, snowy owls, peregrine falcons, ermines, rough-legged hawks, gyrfalcons, beluga whales, snow geese, polar bears, wolves, narwhals, Canada geese, Arctic foxes, Arctic hares, and some barren-ground caribou.

Activities
The most common backpacking route in the park is known as Akshayuk Pass, and follows the Weasel and Owl rivers via Summit Lake. In 2008, heavy rain and warm weather caused Summit Lake to burst through its banks, flooding the Weasel River and washing away the Windy Lake bridge. As a result, the hiking routes in the pass are limited to either side of the Weasel River.

Gallery

See also

 National Parks of Canada
 List of National Parks of Canada
 List of Nunavut parks
 Arctic Cordillera

Notes

Citations

Further reading

External links

 Parks Canada official site
 Mount Thor Peak climbing info
 Information and pictures - from The Tulugak Hotel
 Auyuittuq National Park Information
 Newspaper article about Auyuittuq National Park by Dallas Morning News reporter Dave Levinthal

Baffin Island
Parks in Qikiqtaaluk Region
Protected areas established in 1976
National parks in Nunavut
1976 establishments in the Northwest Territories